In mathematics, a theta constant or 
Thetanullwert' (German for theta zero value; plural Thetanullwerte) is the restriction θm(τ) = θm(τ,0) of a theta function θm(τ,z) with rational characteristic m to z = 0. The variable τ may be a complex number in the upper half-plane in which case the theta constants are modular forms, or more generally may be an element of a Siegel upper half plane in which case the theta constants are Siegel modular forms. The theta function of a lattice is essentially a special case of a theta constant.

Definition

The theta function θm(τ,z) = θa,b(τ,z)is defined by

 

where 

 n is a positive integer, called the genus or rank. 
 m = (a,b) is called the characteristic
 a,b are in Rn
 τ is a complex n by n matrix with positive definite imaginary part
 z is in Cn
 t means the transpose of a row vector.

If a,b  are in Qn then θa,b(τ,0) is called a theta constant.

Examples

If n = 1 and a and b are both 0 or 1/2, then the functions θa,b(τ,z) are the four Jacobi theta functions, and the functions θa,b(τ,0) are the classical Jacobi theta constants. The theta constant θ1/2,1/2(τ,0) is identically zero, but the other three can be nonzero.

References

Automorphic forms
Modular forms